Usha (born 29 May 1980) is an Indian singer who works predominantly in Telugu. She has sung in Kannada and Tamil also. In a career spanning about 10 years, she has established herself as one of the leading playback singers in the Telugu film industry and has worked with many major music directors.

Career

Music competitions
Usha began her singing career with "Paadutha Teeyaga", a music based program on Eenadu Television hosted by singer SP Balasubramanyam. She stood first in the competition and later followed up by winning another music contest titled "Navaragam" on Gemini TV.

Usha participated in various music-related shows on TV between 1996 and 2000. Her performance in "Endaro Mahanubhavlu" on Gemini TV won her appreciation and applause from the audience. She later participated in "Meri Awaz Suno" on Star TV and was one of the finalists in the All-India finals. She also participated in various Hindi programs on channels like ELTV and Zee TV.

Movie career
Usha got her maiden opportunity from Sri. Vandemataram Srinivas, renowned music director. Her first song was from the movie Illalu. She got her major break in Telugu film industry in 2000. She sang various chart busters for Telugu movies like Indra, Chiruta, Athidhi, Pourudu, Varsham, Bhadra, Chitram, Nuvvu Nenu, Manasantha Nuvve, Nuvvu Leka Nenu Lenu, Jayam, Santhosham, Nee Sneham, Avunanna Kadanna and many more (for complete filmography, please see the section below).

Concerts
Usha has performed in close to 150 concerts worldwide. Apart from her own solo concerts, she has performed alongside legendary singers and musicians like Sri. SP Balasubramanyam, Shankar Mahadevan, Hariharan, Mani Sharma, P. Suseela and Mano among many others. Her biggest achievement was performing with Sri. SP Balasubramanyam at the Afro-Asian Games opening ceremony in 2003 in Hyderabad.

TV programmes
 Sa Re Ga Ma Pa - Little Champs (Zee Telugu) - 2007
 Swaraneerajanam (Zee Telugu) - 2008
 Sa Re Ga Ma Pa - Nuvva Nena (Zee Telugu) - 2010  
 Super Singer 7 (MAA TV ) - 2012
 Super Singer 10 (MAA TV)- 2019
 Super singer 2020 by vastavam

Awards

Nandi Awards
 Best Female Playback Singer (TV Category) in 2006 for TV film song "Bommarillu Podarillu"
 Best Female Playback Singer in 2002 for "Chinuku Tadiki" song from Nee Sneham
 Best Female Playback Singer in 2001 for "Kallu Teravani" song from Padma

Filmography
Usha has recorded with music directors, such as Ilaiyaraaja, M. M. Keeravani, Koti, Mani Sharma, Vandemataram Srinivas, Devi Sri Prasad, Kamalakar, RP Patnaik, Chakri, Yuvan Shankar Raja, Ramana Gogula and others. 
 Manorama (2009)
 Ee Vayasulo (2009)
 Junction (2008)
 Mr. Gireesam (2008)
 Sri Medaram Sammakka Sarakka Mahatyam (2008)
 Gunde Jhallumandi (2008)
 Pandurangadu (2008)
 Erra Samudram (2008)
 Pourudu (2008)
 Bhadradri (2008)
 Ontari (2008)
 Athidhi (2007)
 Bhayya (2007)
 Chiruta (2007)
 Aa Roje (2007)
 Kalyanam (2007)
 Manchukurise Velalo (2007)
 Missing (2007)
 Pulakintha (2006)
 Amma Meeda Ottu (2005)
 Avunanna Kaadanna (2005)
 Ayodhya (2005)
 Bhadra (2005)
 Dhairyam (2005)
 Evadi Gola Vaadidi (2005)
 Friendship (2005)
 Good Boy (2005)
 Guru (2005)
 Manchukurise Velalo (2005)
 Meenakshi (2005)
 Moguds Pellams (2005)
 Pellam Pitchodu (2005)
 Pourusham (2005)
 Sada Mee Sevalo (2005)
 Satti (2005)
 Shravana Masam (2005)
 Thakadimitha (2005)
 Venkat Tho Alivelu (2005)
 Aa Naluguru (2004)
 Aadi C/O ABN College (2004)
 Apuroopam (2004)
 Avunu Nijame (2004)
 Jai (2004)
 Koduku (2004)
 Maa Ilavelpu (2004)
 Nayudamma (2004)
 Preminchukunnam Pelliki Randi (2004)
 Sreenu C/O Anu (2004)
 Sreenu Vasanthi Laxmi (2004)
 Swamy (2004)
 Tapana (2004)
 Thanks (2004)
 Varsham (2004)
 Aadanthe Ado Type (2003)
 Aayudham (2003)
 Appudappudu (2003)
 Dil (2003)
 Fools (2003)
 Golmaal (2003)
 Janaki Weds Sriram (2003)
 Johnny (2003)
 Kaartik (2003)
 Kalyanam (2003)
 Maa Bapubommaku Pellanta (2003)
 Missamma (2003)
 Neeku Nenu Naaku Nuvvu (2003)
 Nijam (2003)
 Sambhu (2003)
 Aahuti (2002)
 Allari Ramudu (2002)
 Ammulu (2002)
 Andam (2002)
 Anveshna (2002)
 Chance (2002)
 Dhanush (2002)
 Eeswar (2002)
 Gemini (2002)
 Girl Friend (2002)
 Hai (2002)
 Indra (2002)
 Jayam (2002)
 Jenda (2002)
 Jodi No.1 (2002)
 Kubusam (2002)
 Manasundi...Ra! (2002)
 Memu (2002)
 Nee Premakai (2002)
 Nee Sneham (2002)
 Neethodu Kaavali (2002)
 Nenu Ninnu Premistunnanu (2002)
 Ninne Cherukunta (2002)
 Nuvve Nenu Nene Nuvvu (2002)
 Pellam Oorelithe (2002)
 Premante (2002)
 Prudhvi Narayana (2002)
 Santhosham (2002)
 Sreeram (2002)
 Toli Parichayam (2002)
 Vachinavaadu Suryudu (2002)
 Ammo Bomma (2001)
 Badrachalam (2001)
 Manasantha Nuvve (2001)
 Nuvvu Leka Nenu Lenu (2001)
 Nuvvu Nenu (2001)
 Premaku Swagatham (2001)
 Shivudu (2001)
 Takkari Donga (2001)
 Vechi Vunta (2001)
 Baachi (2000)
 Chitram (2000)
 Shubhavela (2000)
 Chantigadu
 Colours
 Pavan Subbalakshmi Preminchukunnarata
 Ramma ! Chilakamma
 Rowdi

Telugu discography

External links

Official Website

Interview I
Interview II
 Interview III
 Interview IV
Video interview
Discography I – II – III
About Ilaiyaraaja
Usha's Wedding
Usharuga Audio Function
Usha in Padalanivundi

1979 births
Living people
Indian women playback singers
Telugu playback singers
21st-century Indian singers
Nandi Award winners
People from Guntur district
Singers from Andhra Pradesh
Film musicians from Andhra Pradesh
Women musicians from Andhra Pradesh
21st-century Indian women singers